Kaushal Prasad Manda  is an Indian actor and model who predominantly works in Telugu language films and TV serials.

Career 
Manda made his debut as a child artist in 1982–1983 with Telugu TV serial Evanni Chedanunchu. Then he participated in the Grasim Mr. India contest in 1998 and became one of the top 6 finalists in the show. He made a lead role in Gemini TV's blockbuster show Chakravakam (2003-2008). He won the Nandi Award for the Best TV Actor in 2003 for his role as Sagar in Chakravakam. He was the host for Gemini TV's popular dance show Dance Baby Dance in 2005. He also made a role in Gemini TV's Devatha (2010-2013). He did a lead role in Zee Telugu's Suryavamsham serial from 2017 to 2019. He was a contestant and the winner of Star Maa's reality TV show Bigg Boss Telugu 2.

He made his film debut with a supporting role in Mahesh Babu's debut film, Rajakumarudu, in 1999, and also played a role in Prabhas's film Mr. Perfect (2011). He appeared in 85 films and 38 serials.  Manda continued his modelling career and appeared in many commercial ads. He started his own model management and ad film company, The Looks Productions in 1999.

Politics 
Kaushal Manda joined the Bharatiya Janata Party in November 2019.

Filmography

Television

Films
 All films are in Telugu, unless otherwise noted.

Advertisements 

Kaushal's ad campaigns are done under his marketing communication agency, "The Looks Productions"
Model for Babaji Boxer, Grasim, Giordani, Aparna Sarovar, Vijaya Textiles, IKEA, Oakwood Hotels, M&S, Linen Club, Linen Vogue, RS Bros, South India Shopping Mall, and Visakha Dairy

References

External links

1981 births
Living people
Telugu television anchors
Male actors in Telugu television
Indian male television actors
Beauty pageant contestants from India
Indian male models
People from Visakhapatnam
People from Uttarandhra
Winner s2
Big Brother (franchise) winners
Bigg Boss (Telugu TV series) contestants
Telugu male actors